Helsingør Custom House (Danish: Helsingør Toldkammer) is a former custom house situated next to Helsingør station in central Helsingør, Denmark. Completed in 1891 to a Historicist design by Johan Daniel Herholdt, it replaced Øresund Custom House, which had played a central role in Denmark's collection of Sound Dues before it was demolished in connection with an expansion of the harbour in the 1860s. The new custom house remained in use until 1976 and is today part of the Kulturværftet, a nearby cultural centre, hosting smaller concerts, exhibitions and other events.

History

Øresund Custom House

The first custom house in Helsingør was called Øresund Custom House, reflecting its role in the collection of Sound Dues from all ships that passed through the Øresund.

In 1681, the custom house moved to a Late Medieval building on Strandgade which was acquired from a bookkeeper named Claus Liime. In 1737-39, Niels Eigtved, Lauritz de Thurah and Philip de Lange—three of Denmark's most significant architects of the time—all created design proposals for a new custom house. In the end, none of their designs were used when a new custom house was built on the corner of Sophie Brahes Gade and Strandgade in 1740–42. The building was instead designed by the otherwise unknown architect N in a mixture of Baroque and Rococo style. It measured approximately 25 by 11 metres and was topped by a Mansard roof. The central three-bay projection was topped by a triangular pediment with Christian VI's gilded monogram. The relief and the building's other sandstone decorations were executed by Jacob Fortling. Below the triangular pediment was an architrave and frieze with the inscription Øresunds Toldkammer Anno 1740 ("Øresund's Custom House Anno 1740"). The building contained a large central hall flanked by offices on each side.

On the corner of Sophie Brahes Gade and Stengade, to the rear of the Custom House, its director, Wilhelm August von der Osten, constructed a private residence. The house was in 1774 sold to the Custom Authority and used as official residence for its directors. A  wing on Sofie Brahe Gade contained stables, servants quarters and a gate. In 1830-31, Øresund Custom House was expanded with two new wings as a result of the increasing number of ships that passed through the Øresund. A clock also replaced Christian VI's monogram above the entrance in the main wing.

The current custom house
Following the abolition of the Sound Dues in 1867, it was decided to expand Helsingør's docklands to create room for ship repair as well as a coal station for the passing steam vessels. The custom house was pulled down in 1859 and the director's house in 1862.

Royal Building Inspector Johan Daniel Herholdt was charged with the design of a new building which was inaugurated on 16 November 1891. The custom house remained in use until 1976. In 1989, Kulturhuset Toldkammeret, a self-owning cultural venue, opened at the site.

Architecture
The building, which occupies an entire block, is designed in the Historicist style which is typical of Harholdt as well as of Danish architecture in the late 19th century. The three-winged complex surrounds a cobbled courtyard which is closed on Strandgade by a  wall.

Directors
 1664-1668 Marcus Meibom
 1738-1764 Wilhelm August von der Osten
 1764-1766 Niels Krabbe Vind
 1766-1770 Johann Hartwig Ernst von Bernstorff
 1770-1772Adolph Sigfried von der Osten
 1772-1772 Jørgen Erik Skeel
 1772-1776 Joachim Godske Moltke
 1776-1811 Christian Numsen
 1811-18?? Frederik Moltke
 1833-1839 Adam Gottlob von Krogh
 1839-1850 Nicolai Abraham Holten
 1850-1857 Christian Albrecht Bluhme

See also
 Skibsklarerergaarden
 Classen Mansion (Helsingør)

References

External links
 Official website
 Toldkammeret at Kongernes Nordsjælland
 Helsingør Custom House at arkark.dk

Listed buildings and structures in Helsingør Municipality
Historicist architecture in Denmark
Government buildings completed in 1891
1891 establishments in Denmark
Custom houses